Noroxymorphone is an opioid which is both a metabolite of oxymorphone and oxycodone and is manufactured specifically as an intermediate in the production of narcotic antagonists such as naltrexone and others. It is a potent agonist of the μ-opioid receptor, but is poorly able to cross the blood-brain-barrier into the central nervous system, and for this reason, has only minimal analgesic activity.

In the United States, noroxymorphone is controlled as a Schedule II Narcotic controlled substance with an ACSCN of 9637 and in 2014 the DEA set annual aggregate manufacturing quotas of 17 500 kilogrammes for conversion and 1262.5 kg for sale. In other countries, it may be similarly controlled, controlled at a lower level, or regulated in another way.

See also 
 Oxymorphone hydrazone
 Oxymorphol - a metabolite of oxymorphone and an intermediate in the creation of hydromorphone
 Hydromorphone
 Oxycodone
 Norbuprenorphine

References 

4,5-Epoxymorphinans
Semisynthetic opioids
German inventions
Phenols
Ketones
Tertiary alcohols
Ethers
Mu-opioid receptor agonists
Euphoriants